Panapompom Island is an island of Papua New Guinea. It is in the Deboyne Islands atoll of the Louisiade Archipelago.

References

Islands of Milne Bay Province
Louisiade Archipelago